Armaan Zorace is a Hollywood film director, producer and screenwriter.

Career
Inspired by the works of Stanley Kubrick and Steven Spielberg, Zorace made his debut in 2011 with the short film God Is Dead, which was nominated for an award at the Cannes Film Festival in 2011.

In 2019 he began directing the horror film Wraith. The film is set to feature a live Islamic exorcism according to horror website Bloody Disgusting. As of 2019, he is also working on a superhero movie Gamma Man .

He is currently producing a film with Matt Reeves titled Switchboard.

Filmography

References

External links

Living people
Film directors from Bangalore
Indian male screenwriters
21st-century Indian film directors
1983 births